Douglas Smith is an American writer, historian and translator best known for his books about the history of Russia.

Smith was born and raised in Minnesota. After studying German and Russian at the University of Vermont, he earned a PhD in History from the University of California, Los Angeles.  He has also worked for the US Department of State in the Soviet Union, and as a Russia analyst for Radio Free Europe. 

Smith lives in Seattle with his wife and their two children.

Bibliography 

 The Russian Job: The Forgotten Story of How America Saved the Soviet Union from Ruin. Farrar, Straus and Giroux, 2019. 
 Rasputin: Faith, Power, and the Twilight of the Romanovs. Farrar, Straus and Giroux, 2016.   
 Former People: The Final Days of the Russian Aristocracy. Farrar, Straus and Giroux, 2012.   
 The Pearl: A True Tale of Forbidden Love in Catherine the Great's Russia. Yale University Press, 2008. 
 Love and Conquest: Personal Correspondence of Catherine the Great and Prince Grigory Potemkin. Northern Illinois University Press, 2004. 
 Working the Rough Stone: Freemasonry and Society in Eighteenth-Century Russia. Northern Illinois University Press, 1999.

References 

Living people
Historians of Russia
21st-century American historians
21st-century American male writers
Year of birth missing (living people)
Historians from Minnesota
American male non-fiction writers